Johan von Blanc, born Michel Le Blanc (France, 1738 - Karlskrona, Sweden, 21 January 1796), was a French actor and acrobat active in Sweden. He was the leader of the travelling theater  ('Gemenasian Company'), and the director of the first permanent theater in Gothenburg, Comediehuset, between 1780-86. He played a major role in the history of Gothenburg as well as the theater in Sweden outside Stockholm.

References 

1738 births
1796 deaths
18th-century Swedish male actors
18th-century French male actors
French male stage actors
French acrobatic gymnasts
18th century in Gothenburg
Swedish theatre directors
18th-century theatre managers